Arellano is a Spanish surname. Notable people with the surname include:

Agnes Arellano (born 1949), Filipina sculptor
Alonso de Arellano, Spanish explorer
Arcadio Arellano (1872–1920), Filipino architect
Cayetano Arellano (1847–1920), the first Chief Justice of the Supreme Court of the Republic of the Philippines
Ching Arellano (1960–2011), Filipino comedian and actor
Deodato Arellano, Filipino patriot, propagandist and the first president of the Supreme Council of the Katipunan during the Philippine Revolution against Spain
Drew Arellano (born 1980), Filipino TV host, and actor
Elvira Arellano (born 1975), illegal Mexican immigrant to the USA
Erasma Arellano, Filipino track and field athlete
Gustavo Arellano, publisher and editor
Jesús Arellano (born 1973), Mexican football player
Joaquin Ramirez de Arellano, lawyer, professor and journalist
José Ramirez de Arellano (1705–1770), Spanish architect and sculptor of the Baroque
Juan de Arellano (1614–1676), Spanish painter
Juan M. Arellano (1888–1960), Filipino architect
Juan Ramirez de Arellano (1725–1782), Spanish painter of the Baroque Era
Luis Arellano (born 1989), Venezuelan footballer who plays for a Spanish club CF Badalona, as a goalkeeper
Manuel Arellano (born 1957), Spanish economist
Marcy Arellano (born 1986), Filipino basketball player
Omar Arellano (born 1987), Mexican football player
Oswaldo López Arellano (1921–2010), former President of Honduras
Prospero Nale Arellano (1937–2014), Filipino Roman Catholic bishop
Raul Arellano (1935–1997), Mexican football forward who played for Mexico in the 1954 FIFA World Cup
Robert Arellano, American author.